The Calgary Cowboys were a Junior A ice hockey team in the Alberta Junior Hockey League based out of Calgary, Alberta.  They were one of the five founding members of the AJHL in 1963.  The Cowboys lasted only two years before ceasing operations. 

In 1963–64, the Cowboys lost to the Calgary Buffaloes for the inaugural AJHL championship three games to one.

The team folded prior to the 1965–66 season with most players moving to the cross town Buffaloes.  One season later, in 1966–67, the Buffaloes resurrected the Cowboys name, which they would retain until their demise in 1969–70.

Season-by-season record

Note: GP = games played, W = wins, L = losses, T = ties, Pts = points, GF = goals for, GA = goals against

1No regular season was played in 1963–64, league had a playoff only to determine champion

See also
List of ice hockey teams in Alberta
Ice hockey in Calgary
Calgary Canucks
Calgary Spurs
Calgary Royals

References
Alberta Junior Hockey League website
AJHL Annual Guide & Record Book 2006-07

Defunct Alberta Junior Hockey League teams
Defunct ice hockey teams in Alberta
Cow
Ice hockey clubs established in 1963
1963 establishments in Alberta
1965 disestablishments in Alberta
Sports clubs disestablished in 1965